Suri (also spelt as Siuri) is a city and a municipality in the Indian state of West Bengal. It is the headquarters of the Birbhum district.

Geography

Location 
Suri is 220 km from State capital Kolkata (Calcutta), 90 km from Durgapur, 34 km from Bolpur–Santiniketan, 55 km from Andal and 19 km from Sainthia on the Andal–Sainthia branch line of Eastern Railway. It is on Panagarh–Morgram Highway.(known as N.H 60). It has an average elevation of 71 metres (233 feet). It is situated on the extended part of Chota Nagpur Plateau. Tilpara barrage on Mayurakshi River is located 3 km north-west of Suri.

As per the District Census Handbook 2011, Suri covered an area of 9.47 km2.

History
Prior to the advent of the British in India and their acquisition of the territory of Bengal, Suri was but merely a small village. Yet, the British colonists preferred to choose Suri as the district headquarters of Birbhum, probably owing to convenience of transport and communication. Suri was well-connected to many places via road, however, it is not possible to tell about the conditions of those roads clearly. These roads can be traced in James Rennel's map of the 'Jungleterry District'(1779).
After the defeat of Siraj ud-Daulah, the Nawab of Bengal, the British placed many puppet-kings in his place. When Mir Quasim was the Nawab, he ordered all the zamindars (landlords) to pay more revenue. At this, the ruler of Rajnagar, Asad Jama Khan disagreed. In December 1760, the army of the Nawab and the British marched together to attack Birbhum. Asad Jama Khan also got prepared with a cavalry of about 5,000 soldiers, and an infantry of nearly 20,000. In the battle, Asad Jama Khan was defeated and his zamindari was snatched. He took shelter amidst the very dense woods of Chotanagpur. There he had a clandestine meeting with a Maratha army general, Shivabhatta, and Shivabhatta joined him with a cavalry of two to three thousand soldiers as well as a large infantry. Another battle was fought near Kariddhya in 1763 in which he was defeated again. Thus, the British got the control of Suri.
During the early years of the British rule, Bishnupur and Birbhum was administered from Murshidabad. Then, a new district was formed joining Birbhum and Bishnupur, and Suri was made the headquarters. During this time, British officials used the name '(Laat) Hydrabad', the name Suri was also used, but only later. 
G.R. Foley was the first District Collector of Birbhum. He was appointed in 1786. Then, J. Sherburne became the collector and after him, Christopher Keating became the collector. 
Suri Municipality started functioning from 1876. Then, the population of Suri was no more than 7,000. The first Chairman of the municipality was A.A. Owen. Rail transport arrived in Suri in 1913 when the first train started on the route Andal–Sainthia.

Economics
The chief industries of Suri include rice milling, cotton and silk weaving, and furniture manufacture.

In March 2008, a private Kolkata-based firm, Ramsarup Group, unveiled a proposal for large-scale investment in a greenfield power plant and cement manufacturing plant worth Rs 2200 crores (US$550 million) was submitted to the Government of West Bengal. Bakreshwar Thermal Power Plant is around 12 kilometres away from Suri town.

Demographics

As of 2011 Indian Census, Suri had a total population of 1,06,789, of which 54,589 were males and 52,200 were females. The sex ratio in Suri is 963. Population within the age group of 0 to 6 years was 5,935. The total number of literates in Suri was 53,845, which constituted 79.3% of the population with male literacy of 82.8% and female literacy of 75.7%. The effective literacy rate of 7+ population of Suri was 86.9%, of which male literacy rate was 90.8% and female literacy rate was 82.9%. The Scheduled Castes and Scheduled Tribes population was 12,857 and 627 respectively. Suri had 22385 households in 2011.

Transport
Suri has a well organized road transport system with both Govt. Bus Service (SBSTC, NBSTC & WBTC) and private bus service. The town is well connected to major towns and cities like - Kolkata, Durgapur, Asansol, Purulia, Bankura, Medinipur, Digha, Massanjore, Dumka, Bolpur, Burdwan, English Bazar, Jalpaiguri, Siliguri, Katwa, Balurghat, Raiganj etc. through roadway.

Siuri is a model Railway Station. It is situated at the southern part of the town, at Hatjan Bazar. It connects Suri directly with places like Howrah, Kolkata, Bardhaman, Durgapur, Guwahati, Dibrugarh, Malda, Siliguri, Puri, Chennai, Surat, Jhajha, Asansol, Ranchi Nagpur, Bilaspur, Bhubaneswar, Visakhapatnam, Dimapur, Jamshedpur, Purulia, Cuttack, Vijayawada, Raipur, Durg etc. Some of the important trains that run via Siuri are,
 Vananchal Express
 Surat–Malda Town Express
 Ranchi–Kamakhya Express
 Puri-Kamakhya Express (via Adra)
 Jhajha–Dibrugarh Weekly Express
 Mayurakshi Fast Passenger
 Nagaon Express
 Dibrugarh–Tambaram Express
 Hool Express
 Siuri-Sealdah Memu Express

Language
Principal language of communication is Bengali and English.

Education
Colleges in Suri include Birbhum Mahavidyalaya and Suri Vidyasagar College, both affiliated to the University of Burdwan. Birbhum Institute of Engineering & Technology and Sri Ramakrishna Shilpa Vidyapith, also known as "L. C. College" provide technical education. Another 2 Diploma Technical Colleges (private)at Tasarkanta, Suri, and Bandhersole, Suri. Also five D.ED. Colleges and five B.ED. colleges situated at Suri. Total 18 Higher Secondary Schools including a West Bengal Govt. School ( Birbhum Zilla School ) 4 C.B.S.E. Senior Secondary Schools namely K.E. Karmel, JNV, Kendriya Vidyalaya and UP Public School. One W.B.B.S.E. English Medium school-St.Andrews. The Albatross Public School follows CBSE curriculum and also allows Cambridge International Examination. The Levelfield School has also joined the list of private schools offering higher secondary education.

Some notable schools of Suri are Birbhum Zilla School (established-1851), R.T. Girls' High School (established-1884 as River Thompson Girls' High School, later renamed as Rabindranath Tagore Girls' High School), Suri Public and Chandragati Mustafi Memorial High School (established-1856 as Suri Middle English School), Suri Benimadhab Institution (established-1917), Kaligati Smriti Narishiksha Niketan, Suri Ramkrishna Vidyapeeth and Muuk-Badhir Vidyalaya (Deaf and Dumb School, established-1936).Satsang Mission Medical College, Hospital & Cancer Research Institute is expected to be completed in the next 3 years followed by Tapaban Vidyalaya, Rishi Sandilya University, Purosattam Pharma & Retail Chain, Satsang Mission Krishi Vigyan Kendra by the Thakur Anukul Chandra Satsang Mission Sadhanpith at Haripur Dham, Chandrapur, Suri, Birbhum.

Libraries
The first library set up in Suri was the library of Birbhum Zilla School(established-1851). Then, "Ratan Library" was set up by Sibratan Mitra, a writer as well as the father of another writer, Gourihara Mitra, in Malipara, Suri. It had a vast collection of rare manuscripts, ancient statues, idols, coins, maps and images. All these were donated to the library of the Visva-Bharati University later. The Ramaranjan Town Hall and Public Library was set up in 1900. Now it is known by the name -"Vivekananda Granthagaar o Ramaranjan Paurabhawan (Viivekananda Library and Ramaranjan Town Hall)". This library cum town hall has been a witness to many a great and remarkable incident in the history of Suri.
The District Library of Birbhum(established-1955), set up during the implementation of the first five-year plan, stands beside the Vivekanada Library and Ramaranjan Town hall.

Civil Administration
There is a Suri municipality. It is divided into 21 wards. It was controlled by the Indian National Congress-Trinamool Congress alliance. In the 2010 municipal elections, the municipality faced a hung verdict. Later, the Trinamool Congress with 8 councillors, formed the municipal board by taking the support of 6 Congress councillors. In  municipal elections of 2015, TMC won 15 seats, INC won 3 seats, and BJP got 1 seat. Municipal Election 2021 Trinamool Congress won all 21 wards

Local specialities
Suri is famous for a special sweetmeat called Murabba & Achar (fruits/vegetables preserved in sugar syrup) comes in a wide number of varieties, which includes Murabba of Satamooli.

Places of worship

“Serious scholars of terracotta have accepted Birbhum as the place where some of the finest terracotta temples of Bengal are found…  the oldest and the finest temple — known as Radha Damodar temple — is in Suri town. It’s a majestic aatchala dedicated to Damodar, the other name of Shiva.”

David J. McCutchion mentions the aatchala Radha-Shyam temple built in the 17-18th century, brick-built with phulpathar facades richly carved.

Suri is one of those places where religious harmony is found.

Some famous temples are situated in Suri. Moumachhi Club has established a Kali temple in Suri, which is unique and grand in this town. Other famous temples are Bamni Kalibari, Bhabatarini Kalibari, Dangalpara Anandapur Sarbajanin Matrimandir and Shib Mandir, Radha Ballav Mandir, Shani Mandir, Damodar Mandir, Rabindrapalli Kalibari, Rakshakali Temple, Kendua Dakshin Para Kali Mandir.

Durga temple of Chattoraj family is a very old and heritage temple of the town. it is situated at Seharapara. A lot of people visit this temple during the Durga Puja. The newly established Shiv Mandir attracts many people of the area. People will love to experience the rituals of the traditional Durga Puja.

Singha Bahini Mandir, situated in Barui-Para is another very old temple which attracts many devotees  every day. The traditional-style Durga puja and Kali puja at the Singha Bahini Mandir is also  enjoyed by the devotees.

There are a few mosques in Suri and among them, the Masjid at Masjid More and the one at Madrasa Road deserve special mention. Suri is famous for Dargah of Hazrat Data  Mehboob Shah. Dargah is flocked by thousands of devotees every day.

There are three churches in this town. The oldest one is Northern Evangelical Lutheran Church, Suri situated near Lalkuthipara in Suri.

Festivals
Every year in Suri there is a very famous fair held, called the 'Barobagan Mela'(Now postponed due to political problems). This historic fair was inaugurated by the then Governor of Bengal Lord Brabourne. Religious festivals like Durga Puja, Laxmi Puja, Kali Puja, Diwali, Jagaddhatri Puja, Janmashtami, Hanuman Puja, Ram Navami, Eid, Muharram, Christmas  are celebrated in Suri. Book-fairs are also held every 3–4 years.

Climate
The climate of the district is generally dry, mild and healthy. The hot weather usually lasts from the middle of March to the middle of the June, the rainy season from the middle of June to the middle of October, and the cold weather from middle of October to the middle of March. They do not always correspond to these limit. The wind is from the south-east in the summer and from the north-west in the winter.
The minimum and maximum temperature data for Suri is given below - 
For the Year 2011 (in degree Celsius)- 

For the year 2012 (in degree Celsius)- 

The average precipitation in Suri is 1307 mm (130.7 cm). It is the lowest in December with an average of 3 mm, while it is the highest in August (299 mm) and in July(297 mm). The average annual temperature is 26.2 °C.

References

Cities and towns in Birbhum district
Cities in West Bengal